The Early Islands are a group of small islands lying just west of the Cosgrove Ice Shelf in the southeast corner of Ferrero Bay, Amundsen Sea. They were mapped by the United States Geological Survey from ground surveys and U.S. Navy air photos, 1960–66, and were named by the Advisory Committee on Antarctic Names for Tommy Joe Early, a biologist with the Ellsworth Land Survey, 1968–69.

See also 
 List of Antarctic and sub-Antarctic islands

References 

Islands of Ellsworth Land